Events from the 1390s in England.

Incumbents
Monarch – Richard II (to 30 September 1399), then Henry IV

Events
 1390
 Parliament passes a statute forbidding retainers to wear livery whilst off-duty:
 Statute of Provisors prohibits clergy from accepting benefices from the Pope.
 September – the future King Henry IV of England) supports the Teutonic Knights at the siege of Vilnius in the Lithuanian Civil War.
 John Gower's poem Confessio Amantis is completed.
 1391
 Parliament re-asserts royal prerogatives.
 1392
 King Richard II retakes control of London.
 Thomas of Woodstock, 1st Duke of Gloucester created Lieutenant of Ireland but forbidden to actually travel there.
 Penistone Grammar School, which will in the late 20th century become one of the first community comprehensive schools in England, is founded near Barnsley.
 1393
Hundred Years' War: Peace negotiations between England and France at Calais.
 Rebellion in northern England protesting at peace negotiations with France is quickly suppressed.
 Statute of Praemunire makes it an offence to promote Papal Bulls or excommunications.
 The hammerbeam roof of Westminster Hall is commissioned from royal carpenter Hugh Herland.
 Approximate date – Julian of Norwich begins to write Revelations of Divine Love about her sixteen mystical visions.
 1394
 2 October – King Richard leads an expedition to Ireland to enforce his rule there.
 25 December – Richard defines the borders of English rule in Ireland; later to become known as the English Pale.
 First scholars enter Winchester College.
 1395
 15 May – Richard leaves Ireland, having achieved his objectives.
Lollard manifesto The Twelve Conclusions of the Lollards attached to the doors of St Paul's Cathedral and Westminster Abbey.
 1396
 9 March – Hundred Years' War: 28-year truce signed with France.
 25 September – Thomas Arundel succeeds William Courtenay as Archbishop of Canterbury.
 31 October – marriage of the widowed Richard II of England (29) and 6-year-old Isabella of Valois, the daughter of Charles VI of France.
 1397
 10 February – John Beaufort becomes Earl of Somerset.
 6 June – Richard Whittington is nominated as Lord Mayor of London for the first time.
 12 July – Richard II attempts to reassert authority over his kingdom by arresting members of a group of powerful barons known as the Lords Appellant.
 September – Parliament condemns the Lords Appellant, impeaching Duke of Gloucester, Richard FitzAlan, 11th Earl of Arundel, and Thomas de Beauchamp, 12th Earl of Warwick.
 29 September – John Holland, Earl of Huntingdon is created Duke of Exeter by his half-brother Richard II. Thomas Holland, 3rd Earl of Kent, John's nephew, is created Duke of Surrey.
 8 November – Roger Walden enthroned as Archbishop of Canterbury after Thomas Arundel is banished from the realm by King Richard II.
 1398
 27 January – Parliament meets at Shrewsbury and annuls the acts of the 1388 Parliament.
 16 September – King Richard stops a duel between his cousin, Henry of Bolingbroke, and Thomas de Mowbray, 1st Duke of Norfolk.
 October – King Richard II exiles both Henry Bolingbroke and the Duke of Norfolk for ten years in order to end their feud.
 Mount Grace Priory is established in Yorkshire by Thomas Holland, 1st Duke of Surrey.

 1399
 3 February – death of John of Gaunt, uncle of King Richard II and father of Henry Bolingbroke.
 18 March – Richard II cancels the legal documents allowing the exiled Henry Bolingbroke to inherit his father's land.
 23 April – St George's Day in England is first officially celebrated as a holiday.
 29 May – Richard travels to Ireland to suppress a rebellion.
 4 July – Henry Bolingbroke, with exiled former archbishop of Canterbury Thomas Arundel as an advisor, returns to England and begins a military campaign to reclaim his confiscated land.
 19 August – having returned from Ireland, Richard is taken prisoner by Henry's followers at Conway Castle.
 29 September – abdication of Richard II, the first for an English monarch.
 30 September – Parliament accepts Henry Bolingbroke as the new king,  the first since the Norman Conquest whose mother tongue is English rather than French.
 13 October – coronation of Henry IV of England.
 21 October – Thomas Arundel is restored as Archbishop of Canterbury, replacing Roger Walden.
 First definite record of beer (rather than ale) being brewed in England, at Great Yarmouth by Peter Woutersone, a "Ducheman".

Births
 1390
 3 October – Humphrey, Duke of Gloucester (died 1447)
 27 December – Anne de Mortimer, claimant to the throne (died 1411)
 John Dunstaple, composer (died 1453)
 1391
 6 November – Edmund Mortimer, 5th Earl of March, politician (died 1425)
 Thomas West, 2nd Baron West (died 1415)
 1392
 3 February – Henry Percy, 2nd Earl of Northumberland (died 1455)
 3 August – John de Mowbray, 2nd Duke of Norfolk (born at Calais; died 1432)
 12 or 31 August – William Bonville, 1st Baron Bonville (executed 1461)
 1394
 Michael de la Pole, 3rd Earl of Suffolk (died 1415)
 1395
 18 March – John Holland, 2nd Duke of Exeter, military leader (died 1447)
 7 September – Reginald West, 6th Baron De La Warr, politician (died 1427)
 1396
 16 October – William de la Pole, 1st Duke of Suffolk (died 1450)
John de Ros, 7th Baron de Ros (died 1421)
 1398
 Approximate date
 James Tuchet, 5th Baron Audley (killed 1459)
 William Waynflete, born William Patten, Lord Chancellor and bishop of Winchester (died 1486)
 1399
 Approximate date – William Canynge, merchant (died 1474)

Deaths
 1390
 14 August – John FitzAlan, 2nd Baron Arundel, soldier (born 1364)
 1392
 John Arderne, surgeon (born 1307)
 1393
 22 February – John Devereux, 1st Baron Devereux (year of birth unknown)
 6 August – John de Ros, 5th Baron de Ros (born 1365)
 1394
 17 March – John Hawkwood, mercenary (born 1320)
 4 June – Mary de Bohun, wife of Henry IV (born c. 1369)
 7 June – Anne of Bohemia, queen of Richard II (plague) (born 1366)
 1396
 31 July – William Courtenay, Archbishop of Canterbury (born c. 1342)
 29 November – Robert Ferrers, 2nd Baron Ferrers of Wem (born 1373)
 John Beaumont, 4th Baron Beaumont, Constable of Dover Castle (born 1361)
 1397
 25 April – Thomas Holland, 2nd Earl of Kent (born c. 1350)
 3 June – William de Montacute, 2nd Earl of Salisbury, military leader (born 1328)
 15 September – Adam Easton, Catholic Cardinal (year of birth unknown)
 21 September – Richard FitzAlan, 11th Earl of Arundel, military leader (executed) (born 1346)
 1398
 20 July – Roger Mortimer, 4th Earl of March, heir to the throne of England (born 1374)
 1399
 3 February – John of Gaunt, 1st Duke of Lancaster (born 1340)
 24 March – Margaret Plantagenet, Duchess of Norfolk (born c. 1320)
 29 July – William le Scrope, 1st Earl of Wiltshire (executed) (born 1350)
 22 September – Thomas de Mowbray, 1st Duke of Norfolk, politician (born 1366)

References